The Alpini Battalion "Val Chiese" is an inactive battalion of the Italian Army's mountain infantry speciality, the Alpini, which distinguished itself in combat during World War I and World War II.

History

World War I 

The battalion was raised on 15 February 1915 with reservists of the Alpini Battalion "Vestone" of the 5th Alpini Regiment. The battalion's name, like the names of all Alpini battalions raised during World War I with first line reservists, was the name of a valley near the active battalion's depot; in the "Val Chiese" battalion's case the Chiese valley, which extends north from Vestone. As with all Alpini battalions the recruits for the battalions were drafted exclusively from the area surrounding the battalions depot. Initially the battalion fielded the 253rd and 254th Alpini companies, and received the 255th Alpini Company on 8 July 1915 after Italy's full mobilization after the country's entry into the war.

The Val Chiese battalion's history is intertwined with the history of the 5th Alpini Regiment, with which it served during World War I. After the war the battalion was disbanded.

World War II 

The battalion was reformed on 1 September 1939 and participated in the Italian invasion of France in June and July 1940. Afterwards the battalion was once more disbanded on 31 October 1940 and the battalion's reservists dismissed. However as the Greco-Italian War has grind to a halt in the Pindus mountains the battalion was raised again in December 1940 and sent on 14 January 1941 to Albania, where it joined the 11th Alpini Regiment.

After the German invasion of Greece and the Greek surrender the battalion returned to Italy and was assigned to the 2nd Alpine Division "Tridentina"'s 6th Alpini Regiment. In July 1942 the Tridentina was assigned to the Italian Army in Russia and sent to the Eastern Front, where regiment and battalion barely escaped annihilation during the Battle of Nikolayevka in January 1943. For its conduct during the campaign in Russia 6th Alpini Regiment was awarded a Gold Medal of Military Valour.

In spring 1943 the survivors of the Val Chiese battalion were repatriated and garrisoned in the city of Sterzing in South Tyrol. After the announcement of the Armistice of Cassibile on 8 September 1943, regiment and battalion were disbanded by the Germans.

Cold War 

On 1 July 1963 the XXIX Alpini Fortification Battalion in Sterzing was renamed Alpini Battalion "Val Chiese". The battalion was part of the Alpine Brigade "Orobica" and tasked with manning fortifications in the Wipptal, Passeier and Vinschgau valleys. The "Val Chiese" fielded three active and three reserve companies with a wartime strength of more than 1,000 men; two of these companies had come from the disbanded Alpini Battalion "Val Camonica".

  Alpini Battalion "Val Chiese", in Sterzing
  Headquarters and Services Company, in Sterzing
  250th Alpini Company, in Saltaus (Type C*, ex "Val Camonica")
  251st Alpini Company, in Reschen (Type A*, ex "Val Camonica")
  253rd Alpini Company, in Brenner (Type A)
  254th Alpini Company, in Gossensaß (Type A)
  255th Alpini Company, in Pfitsch (Type C)
  364th Alpini Company, in Franzensfeste (Type C)

 Type A = fortification fully equipped, provisioned and manned; close support platoon onsite
 Type B = fortification fully equipped, provisioned and manned; close support platoon off site
 Type C = fortification fully equipped; provisions, crew and close support platoon off site

The fortifications the Val Chiese would man in case of war with the Warsaw Pact had been built as the Alpine Wall in the early stages of World War II. The Val Chiese was to man the following bunker systems with the aim to deny enemy forces passage through the valleys below the Reschen Pass and Brenner Pass:

In the Vinschgau and Passeier valleys:
 Saltaus: 4 bunker, 169 men, 250th Alpini Company (Italian Wikipedia: Sbarramento di Saltusio)
 Mals-Glurns: 9 bunker, no troops assigned after 1964 (before 1964 the 252nd Alpini Company) (Italian Wikipedia: Sbarramento Malles-Glorenza)
 Reschen pass: 9 bunker, 254 men, 251st Alpini Company (Italian Wikipedia: Sbarramento Passo Resia)

In the Eisack valley:
 Brenner pass: 5 bunker, 136 men, 253rd Alpini Company (Italian Wikipedia: Sbarramento Brennero)
 Gossensaß: 7 bunker 190 men, 254th Alpini Company (Italian Wikipedia: Sbarramento di Tenne-Novale)
 Pfitsch: 3 bunker, 121 men, 255th Alpini Company (Italian Wikipedia: Sbarramento di Saletto)
 Franzensfeste: 5 bunker, 165 men, 364th Alpini Company (Italian Wikipedia: Sbarramento di Fortezza)

With fixed fortifications becoming obsolete the battalion was disbanded on 30 June 1979 with only the 253rd Alpini Company remaining on active duty and joining the Alpini Battalion "Val Brenta". After the battalion was disbanded its war flag was transferred to the shrine of the flags at the Vittoriano in Rome.

War flag and coat of arms 
The Gold Medal of Military Valour displayed on the battalion's coat of arms and carried on the battalion's war flag was originally awarded to the 6th Alpini Regiment and duplicated during the 1975 reform for the flag of the "Val Chiese" battalion.

External links
 Battaglione Alpini "Val Chiese" on vecio.it

Sources 
 Franco dell'Uomo, R. di Rosa: "L'Esercito Italiano verso il 2000 - Volume Secondo - Tomo I", Rome 2001, Stato Maggiore dell'Esercito - Ufficio Storico, page: 507

References 

Alpini Battalions of Italy